Cerium(III) fluoride (or cerium trifluoride), CeF3, is an ionic compound of the rare earth metal cerium and fluorine.

It appears as a mineral in the form of fluocerite-(Ce) - a very rare mineral species related mainly to pegmatites and rarely to oxidation zones of some polymetallic ore deposits. CeF3 may be used as a Faraday rotator material in the visible, near-infrared and mid-infrared spectral range.

Structure 
It contains 9-coordinate cerium ions that adopt an approximately tricapped trigonal prismatic coordination geometry, although it can be considered 11-coordinate if two more distant fluorides are considered part of the cerium coordination environment. The three crystallographically independent fluoride ions are 3-coordinate and range in geometry from trigonal planar to pyramidal.

References

Cerium(III) compounds
Fluorides
Lanthanide halides